Gertrud "Trudi" Meyer (13 July 1914 – 23 October 1999) was a German gymnast who competed in the 1936 Summer Olympics. In 1936 she won the gold medal as member of the German gymnastics team.

Although Meyer was the highest individual all-around scorer at these Olympics, she is not recognized as an Olympic All-Around Champion like women gymnasts such as Larissa Latynina, Věra Čáslavská, Nadia Comăneci, Elena Shushunova, or Simone Biles because individual medals were not awarded to women at the Olympics until 1952.  This is a lack-of-individual distinction that she shares with the highest women's individual overall scorer at the 1948 Olympic, Zdeňka Honsová, as well as with whomever was the highest scorer of the women's gymnastics competition at the 1928 Amsterdam Summer Olympic Games.

References

1914 births
1999 deaths
German female artistic gymnasts
Olympic gymnasts of Germany
Gymnasts at the 1936 Summer Olympics
Olympic gold medalists for Germany
Olympic medalists in gymnastics
Medalists at the 1936 Summer Olympics
20th-century German women